Fissidentaceae is a family of haplolepideous mosses (Dicranidae) in the order Dicranales, with a single genus, Fissidens. It was formerly placed in the now-obsolete order Fissidentales.

References

Dicranales
Moss families
Monogeneric plant families